Youth Daily News is a Taiwan daily newspaper. It was founded in 1973 by the government of Taiwan as Young Soldier.

Notes

Sources 
 

1973 establishments in Taiwan
Publications established in 1973
Newspapers published in Taiwan
Chinese-language newspapers (Traditional Chinese)
Mass media in Taipei